Finist'air is a French regional airline based at Brest Bretagne Airport. It provides passenger service, air taxi, and freight transport and currently transports 3,000 passengers annually.

History
Finist'air was founded in 1981 by the government of the Finistère departément to transport passengers between Ouessant (in the Ponant Islands) and Brest.

Destinations
Two daily flights are scheduled on a Brest-Ouessant route.

Fleet
The airline has one new Cessna 208 Caravan.

External links
Finist'air

Airlines of France